Events in the year 1863 in India.

Incumbents
James Bruce, 8th Earl of Elgin, Viceroy (till 20 November)
Sir Robert Napier, acting Viceroy (21 November – 2 December)
Sir William Denison, acting Viceroy (from 2 December)

Events
Sir Syed set up Victoria school at Ghazipur and a translation society called Scientific Society.

Law
Religious Endowments Act
India Stock Certificate Act (British statute)
Colonial Letters Patent Act (British statute)

Births
12 January – Swami Vivekananda, chief disciple of Ramakrishna and founder of Ramakrishna Mission (died 1902).
13 July – Margaret Murray, Anglo-Indian Egyptologist, archaeologist, anthropologist, historian, and folklorist (died 1963 in the United Kingdom)
28 August – Mahatma Ayyankali, was a social reformer who worked for the advancement of those people in the then princely state of Travancore, British India, who were treated as untouchables (died 1941).

References

 
India
Years of the 19th century in India